The statue of Sidney Herbert, 1st Baron Herbert of Lea is an outdoor sculpture in London, United Kingdom. Created by J. H. Foley, it was erected by public subscription in 1867 and was originally placed in the courtyard of Cumberland House, Pall Mall (which at the time was the headquarters of the War Office). It moved with the War Office to Whitehall in 1906, where it was placed (out of public sight) in the courtyard of the new War Office building; but eight years later it was moved again to Waterloo Place to stand alongside the Crimean War Memorial, where it is paired with a statue of Herbert's friend and fellow reformer Florence Nightingale.

See also
 Crimean War Memorial
 Statue of Florence Nightingale, London

References

External links
 

1915 sculptures
Herbert, Sidney
Monuments and memorials in London
Outdoor sculptures in London
Sculptures of men in the United Kingdom